Gurney Paragon is a residential and retail complex in George Town, Penang, Malaysia. Situated at Gurney Drive, it was launched in 2013, and consists of a nine-storey shopping mall, two condominiums and an office block.

The shopping mall's main anchor tenant is TGV Cinemas, which operates a multiplex at its top floor. The mall also contains over 200 outlets spread out over nine floors, including a number of international brands. There are sufficient parking bays at Gurney Paragon to cater its visitors (Gurney Paragon parking rate).

Retail outlets 
Gurney Paragon houses over 40 fashion boutiques and 30 eateries, such as Starbucks, H&M, and Victoria's Secret. Other international brands within the mall include Michael Kors, Oxygen Fitness and Daiso. One of the biggest book store chain with massive selection rows of affordable books, BookXcess, can be found at the 7th and 8th floor.

Entertainment 
TGV Cinemas manages an IMAX-equipped multiplex within Gurney Paragon's ninth floor. The multiplex, which consists of eight standard halls and an IMAX theatre, is TGV Cinemas' first IMAX-equipped multiplex in northern Malaysia.

Location 
Gurney Paragon is situated at Gurney Drive, a popular seafront promenade within the city of George Town.

Awards 
In the 2018 Asia Pacific Property Awards, Gurney Paragon was named Malaysia's best retail development.

See also 
 Gurney Drive
 List of tallest buildings in George Town, Penang

References

External links 

 Gurney Paragon

Shopping malls in Penang
Shopping malls established in 2013
2013 establishments in Malaysia
Buildings and structures in George Town, Penang